Boureni may refer to several villages in Romania:

 Boureni, a village in Afumați Commune, Dolj County
 Boureni, a village in Balș Commune, Iași County
 Boureni, a village in Moțca Commune, Iași County